Colobothea eximia is a species of beetle in the family Cerambycidae. It was described by Per Olof Christopher Aurivillius in 1902. It is known from Colombia, Brazil, and French Guiana.

References

eximia
Beetles described in 1902